Carole Pegg, sometimes Carolanne Pegg, is a British folksinger and violinist, and ethnomusicologist.

In 1970 Pegg and her husband Bob formed British folk rock band Mr. Fox, which dissolved in 1972 when their marriage ended. In 1973 she released a solo album, Carolanne, with Transatlantic Records, and briefly performed with Graham Bond and Pete Macbeth as Magus.

Pegg went on to obtain a doctorate in musicology and become a senior researcher in the music department of Cambridge University.

Pegg's second husband is the Social Anthropologist Dr Nicholas James.

In 2014 she and Tuvan throat singer Radik Tülüsh together released an album as "Goshawk".

Publications
 Mongolian Music, Dance, and Oral Narrative: Performing Diverse Identities (Seattle and London: University of Washington Press, 2001).

References

External links
http://sounds.bl.uk/World-and-traditional-music/Interviews-with-ethnomusicologists/025M-C1397X0010XX-0001V0

Year of birth missing (living people)
Living people
British ethnomusicologists
British folk singers